The Women Couldn't Care Less or Dames Get Along (French: Les femmes s'en balancent) is a 1954 French crime film directed by Bernard Borderie and starring Eddie Constantine, Nadia Gray and Dominique Wilms. It features Peter Cheyney's fictional American detective Lemmy Caution.

Plot 
Lemmy Caution is assigned to investigate undercover.

Cast 
 Eddie Constantine as Lemmy Caution
 Nadia Gray as Henrietta Aymes, Granworth's wife
 Dominique Wilms as Paulette Bénito
 Jacques Castelot as Granworth Aymes
 Robert Burnier as police chief Metts
 Robert Berri as Fernandez / Jean Termiglio
 Darío Moreno as Perera
 Nicolas Vogel as  Jim Maloney
 François Perrot as Langdon Nurdell
 Paul Azaïs as guard
 Guy Henri as Daredo
 Pascale Roberts as Casa Antica's Seller
 Georgette Anys as Mrs. Martinguez
 Gil Delamare as Sagers

References

Bibliography 
 Michel Marie. The French New Wave: An Artistic School. John Wiley & Sons, 2008.

External links
 
 

1954 films
French crime films
1954 crime films
1950s French-language films
Films directed by Bernard Borderie
Films based on British novels
French sequel films
Pathé films
French black-and-white films
1950s French films